Canacidae, incorrectly Canaceidae, or beach flies, surf or surge flies, is a family of Diptera. There are 113 species in 12 genera.
The family now includes Tethininae as a subfamily.

Family description

For terms see Morphology of Diptera.

Minute (1.6–5 mm) yellow, grey or grey-brown pruinose flies with whitish to greyish markings. The head is large with small antenna bearing bare to pubescent arista. The "mouth" is a large oval opening. There are three or four pairs of orbital bristles on the head directed outward (inset upswept). Postvertical bristles are absent but diverging pseudopostocellar bristles are present. Other head bristles present are ocellar bristles, 2-5 pairs of frontal bristles, curving outward, interfrontal bristles and vibrissae ("whiskers"). The genae are high with 1 or more upcurving bristles. Tibiae are without a dorsal preapical bristle.

The wing is unmarked in almost all species. The costa has a subcostal break; the subcosta is parallel to vein R1 and merging with that vein just before the costa. Tibiae without dorsal preapical bristle.

See  Drawings of Canace.

Classification

Biology
Canacidae are mostly intertidal flies. They are found along sea coasts, on the surface of small water bodies, saline and fresh, at places protected from wind. They feed on Infusoria and other minute organisms.

References

External links

http://www.diptera.info/downloads/Munari_Almeida_Andrade_2009.pdf Munari, Almeida, Andrade Description of a new species of Tethina Excellent photos. 
Diptera.info Images
Canacidae in Italian
Encyclopedia of Life World taxa list

 
Brachycera families